A keratin pearl is a keratinized structure found in regions where abnormal squamous cells form concentric layers.  Also called an epithelial pearl, due to a location among squamous cells of the epithelium, this type of structure is sometimes seen with squamous cell carcinoma.

References

External links
 Medical dictionary definition 

Epithelial cells
Keratins